Dr. Mark J. Lewis is a senior American aerospace and defense executive with special expertise in hypersonics.  He is currently the Executive Director of the National Defense Industrial Association's Emerging Technologies Institute, following his role in the second half of 2020 as the acting US Deputy Under Secretary of Defense for Research and Engineering, and before that the Director of Defense Research and Engineering for Modernization. He was the Chief Scientist of the U.S. Air Force, Washington, D.C. from 2004 to 2008 and was the longest-serving Chief Scientist in Air Force history. He served as chief scientific adviser to the Chief of Staff and Secretary of the Air Force, and provided assessments on a wide range of scientific and technical issues affecting the Air Force mission. In this role he identified and analyzed technical issues and brought them to attention of Air Force leaders, and interacted with other Air Staff principals, operational commanders, combatant commands, acquisition, and science & technology communities to address cross-organizational technical issues and solutions. His primary areas of focus included energy, sustainment, long-range strike technologies, advanced propulsion systems, and workforce development.

He additionally interacted with other services and the Office of the Secretary of Defense on issues affecting the Air Force in-house technical enterprise.  He also served on the Steering Committee and Senior Review Group of the U.S. Air Force Scientific Advisory Board (SAB), and was the principal science and technology representative of the Air Force to the civilian scientific and engineering community and to the public at large. He is currently a member of the U.S. Air Force Scientific Advisory Board and Director of the Science and Technology Policy Institute.

Biography

Dr. Lewis joined the faculty of the Aerospace Engineering department of the Clark School at the University of Maryland in College Park in August 1988. He has conducted basic and applied research in, and taught many aspects of, hypersonic aerodynamics, advanced propulsion, and space vehicle design and optimization. His work has spanned the aerospace flight spectrum, from the analysis of conventional jet engines to entry into planetary atmospheres at hypervelocity speeds. His research activities have contributed directly to several NASA and Department of Defense programs in the areas of high-speed vehicle and spacecraft design. Lewis was the founder of the Center for Hypersonic Education and Research, and later the NASA-Air Force Constellation University Institutes Project.

Dr. Lewis was formerly the Willis Young Jr. Professor and Chair of the Department of Aerospace Engineering at the University of Maryland at College Park (stepping down in April 2012). He was also formerly president of the American Institute of Aeronautics and Astronautics (AIAA). He is an author of over 280 technical publications and has served as the research advisor to more than 60 graduate students.  He is active in national and international professional societies, with responsibilities for both research and educational policy and support. In addition, he has served on various advisory boards for the Air Force and DOD, including two terms on the Air Force Scientific Advisory Board, where he participated in several summer studies and chaired a number of science and technology reviews of the Air Force Research Laboratory.  Dr Lewis chaired the National Academies of Science, Engineering, and Medicine on the threat of competitor nations developing hypersonic weapons, which is generally credited with triggering the Department of Defense's significant increase in spending in this area. He was previously on leave from the University of Maryland from 2012-2018, while serving as the Director of the Science and Technology Policy Institute in the Institute for Defense Analysis.

In November 2019, Lewis rejoined the Department of Defense as Director of Defense Research and Engineering for Modernization. In July 2020, he also became acting Deputy Under Secretary of Defense for Research and Engineering after the resignation of Lisa Porter.

At the Massachusetts Institute of Technology, Lewis received two Bachelor of Science degrees (in aeronautics and astronautics and in earth and planetary science), and Master of Science and Doctor of Science degrees in aeronautics and astronautics. He is an honorary fellow of the AIAA and a fellow of the American Society of Mechanical Engineers, a President's Fellow of the Royal Aeronautical Society, and was named an aerospace Laureate by the editors of Aviation Week and Space Technology magazine for his pioneering efforts in promoting research and development of high-speed flight.

Education
 1984 Bachelor of Science (BS), Aeronautics and Astronautics, Massachusetts Institute of Technology, Cambridge, MA
 1984 Bachelor of Science (BS), Earth and Planetary Science, Massachusetts Institute of Technology, Cambridge, MA
 1985 Master of Science, (S.M), Aeronautics and Astronautics, Massachusetts Institute of Technology, Cambridge, MA
 1988 Doctor of Science (ScD), Massachusetts Institute of Technology, Cambridge, MA

Career chronology
 1988–1999, Assistant Professor, later, Associate Professor of Aerospace Engineering, A. James Clark School of Engineering, University of Maryland, College Park
 1999–2004, Professor and Associate Chair of Aerospace Engineering, A. James Clark School of Engineering, University of Maryland, College Park
 2002–2004, Director, Space Vehicle Technology Institute, College Park, Md.
 2004–2008, Chief Scientist of the U.S. Air Force, Washington, D.C.
 2008 – present, Professor of Aerospace Engineering, A. James Clark School of Engineering, University of Maryland, College Park
 2009–2012, Chair of Aerospace Engineering, A. James Clark School of Engineering, University of Maryland, College Park
 2009–2010, President-elect, American Institute of Aeronautics and Astronautics
 2010–2011, President, American Institute of Aeronautics and Astronautics

Awards and honors
 1984 Henry Webb Salisbury Award, MIT
 1984 Office of Naval Research Fellow
 1989 E. Robert Kent Teaching Award
 1992 A. James Clark Service Award*
 1994 National Capital Section Young Scientist/Engineer of the Year, American Institute of Aeronautics and Astronautics
 1997 Aerospace Professor of the Year, University of Maryland
 1998 Abe Zarem Award mentor, AIAA
 2004 Meritorious Civilian Service Award
 2004 Exceptional Civilian Service Award
 2007 Aviation Week and Space Technology Laureate
 IECEC/AIAA Lifetime Achievement Award
 2014 AIAA Dryden Distinguished Lectureship in Research
 2018 Air Force Association Theodore von Karman Award for the most outstanding contribution in the field of science and engineering

Professional memberships and associations
National Institute of Aerospace,  (Fellow)
American Institute of Aeronautics and Astronautics (Fellow)
Royal Aeronautical Society (President's Fellow)
American Society of Mechanical Engineers (Fellow)

References

1962 births
Living people
American aerospace engineers
Chief Scientists of the United States Air Force
University of Maryland, College Park faculty
Scientists from New Rochelle, New York
Engineers from New York (state)